St Michael's Church is a Church of England parish church in Bath, Somerset.

Background
It is located between Broad and Walcot Streets, which both merge onto Northgate Street. Located next to the Post Office Building, the south tower (referred to as the W tower) fronts Northgate street and is prominent on Bath's skyline. The current structure was designed by George Phillips Manners. It possesses a fine example of a Sweetland Organ.

The Church of St Michael's is known as St Michael's Without—it being the first church to be found outside Bath's city walls when exiting from the North Gate. The parish itself was known as St Michael's with St Paul's.

In 2013, with the closure of Holy Trinity Church Queen's Square, the parish boundary grew as the two parishes were merged under St Michael's. At this time, the parish reverted to its original name of St Michael's Without.

From Mondays to Saturdays, the church plays host to a cafe serving hot drinks, cakes and snacks.

Clergy
The Revd Martin Lloyd Williams was rector of St Michael's from 1997 until January 2015, when he left to become Archdeacon of Brighton and Lewes.  There is currently an interregnum.

In November 2015, it was announced that the Revd Roger Driver would become the new incumbent in 2016.

Medieval church
The parish has been located here, outside the walls, since medieval times. It was outside the Northgate and would have been passed by wool merchants traveling on London Road. The area that would in Georgian times be called Bath New Town (not to be confused with neighboring Bathwick New Town) was known as St. Michael's.

Georgian church
Designed and constructed by craftsmen J. Harvey between 1734 and 1742, the structure featured an impressive dome and was half the size of the current Victorian structure.

Victorian church
"St. Michael, Broad Street. At the sharp corner with Walcot Street and in the point de vue up Northgate Street. The church is of medieval original and lay originally ante muros. The present church is of 1835–1837, by G. P. Manners. Its immediate predecessor dated from 1742 and had a dome (Collinson). Manner’s church displays a crazy W tower, tall and narrow with a huge group of three stepped lancet windowes, buttresses with the stepped-set offs of Wells, and at the top a tall octagonal open lantern with spire. The tower is flanked by polygonal porches. The sides have the same buttresses and the same group of lancets. – A "hall-church" inside, that is with aisles the same height as the nave. Thin tall circular piers with four attached shafts. Quadripartite plaster rib-vaulting. Polygonal apse with tall blank arcading. – PAINTING. Two panels attributed to William Hoare and Rombinson. – PLATE. Paten by Clare 1720; Chalice, Flagon and three Dishes by George Wickes 1743; Cup 1797; two Almsdishes 1828. – MONUMENT. Ritual W side of S porch, i.e. really N side of SE porch. Probably by the same hand as the Coward monument in the Abbey, with a weeping putto by an urb. It is to Samuel Emes; date illegible."[1]

It was listed grade II* in 1950.

See also
 List of ecclesiastical parishes in the Diocese of Bath and Wells

External links
 Photos of St. Michael's

 Official Website

References

Nikolaus Pevsner, The Buildings of England: North Somerset and Bristol, (Harmondsworth, Middlesex: Penguin Books, 1958), 107–108.

Churches completed in 1837
19th-century Church of England church buildings
Bath, Saint Michael's Church
Churches in Bath, Somerset
Grade II* listed buildings in Bath, Somerset